The 1911 American Grand Prize was held on November 30, 1911, and was the final race of the 1911 Grand Prix season. It was held on the Savannah, Georgia, road course three days after the Vanderbilt Cup was held on the same track. It was sanctioned by the Automobile Club of America. David Bruce-Brown won by just over two minutes over Eddie Hearne. Bruce-Brown's average speed was 74.458 mph (121.478 km/h).

Classification

References

American Grand Prize
United States Grand Prix
American Grand Prize
History of Savannah, Georgia
Grand Prize
November 1911 sports events